Felipe Andrés Díaz Henríquez (born 9 August 1983) is a Chilean former footballer.

Honours

Club
Rangers
 Primera B: 2011

External links
 
 

1983 births
Living people
Footballers from Santiago
Chilean footballers
Santiago Morning footballers
Rangers de Talca footballers
C.D. Antofagasta footballers
Chilean Primera División players
Primera B de Chile players
Association football midfielders